This is a list of Fabian Tracts of The Fabian Society published up to the end of 1915. It is extracted from Edward R. Pease's history of the society published in 1916. Pease was a founding member of the society. A great number of additional tracts and other series of Fabian books have since been published. The list is continued at List of Fabian Tracts since 1916.

Many tracts were issued without the author's name and not all authors were members of the Society.

Entries are in the form Tract Number/Title/Pages/Author.

* = non-member

1884

1891

23. The Case for an Eight Hours Bill. 16 pp. Sidney Webb.

24. Questions for Parliamentary Candidates. 4 pp. Sidney Webb.

25. Questions for School Board Candidates. 4 pp. Sidney Webb.

26. Questions for London County Councillors. 4 pp. Sidney Webb.

27. Questions for Town Councillors. 4 pp. Rev. C. Peach.

28. Questions for County Council Candidates (Rural). 4 pp. F. Hudson.

29. What to Read. 48 pp. Graham Wallas (1st edition). (Fifth edition,
1910, not included in the series.)

30. The Unearned Increment. 4 pp. Sidney Webb.

31. London's Heritage in the City Guilds. 4 pp. Sidney Webb.

32. The Municipalisation of the Gas Supply. 4 pp. Sidney Webb.

33. Municipal Tramways. 4 pp. Sidney Webb.

34. London's Water Tribute. 4 pp. Sidney Webb.

35. The Municipalisation of the London Docks. 4 pp. Sidney Webb.

36. The Scandal of London's Markets. 4 pp. Sidney Webb.

37. A Labour Policy for Public Authorities. 4 pp. Sidney Webb.

38. Welsh Translation of No. 1.

1892
39. A Democratic Budget. 16 pp.  J.F. Oakeshott .

40. Fabian Election Manifesto. 16 pp.  Bernard Shaw.

41. The Fabian Society: What it has done and how it has done it. 32 pp. G. Bernard Shaw.

42. Christian Socialism. 16 pp. Rev. Stewart D. Headlam.

43. Vote! Vote! Vote! 2 pp. Bernard Shaw.

1893

44. A Plea for Poor Law Reform. 4 pp. Frederick Whelen .

45. Impossibilities of Anarchism. 28 pp. G. Bernard Shaw.

46. Socialism and Sailors. 16 pp. B.T. Hall.

47. The Unemployed. (Rt. Hon.) John Burns.

48. Eight Hours by Law. Henry W. Macrosty.

1894

49. A Plan of Campaign for Labour. 28 pp.  G. Bernard Shaw.

50. Sweating: Its Cause and Remedy. 16 pp.  H.W. Macrosty.

51. Socialism: True and False. 20 pp. Sidney Webb.

52. State Education at Home and Abroad. 16 pp. John William Martin.

53. The Parish Councils Act: What it is and how to work it. 20 pp. (Rt. Hon.) Herbert Samuel.*

54. Humanising of the Poor Law. 24 pp. J.F. Oakeshott.

55. The Workers' School Board Programme. 20 pp.  J.W. Martin.

56. Questions for Parish Council Candidates. 4 pp.  (Rt. Hon.) Herbert Samuel.*

57. Questions for Rural District Council Candidates. 4 pp. (Rt. Hon.) Herbert Samuel.*

58. Allotments and How to Get Them. 4 pp.  (Rt. Hon.) Herbert Samuel.*

59. Questions for Candidates for Urban District Councils. 4 pp.

60. The London Vestries: What they are and what they do. 20 pp. Sidney Webb.

1895

61. The London County Council: What it is and what it does. 16 pp. J.F. Oakeshott.

62. Parish and District Councils: What they are and what they can do. 16 pp. (No. 53 re-written.)

63. Parish Council Cottages and how to get them. 4 pp.  Edward R. Pease.

64. How to Lose and how to Win an Election. 2 pp.  Ramsay MacDonald.

65. Trade Unionists and Politics. 2 pp.  Frank Wallace Galton.

66. A Program for Workers. 2 pp.  Edw. R. Pease.

1896

67. Women and the Factory Acts. 16 pp. Mrs. Sidney Webb.

68. The Tenant's Sanitary Catechism. 4 pp.  Arthur Hickmott.

69. The Difficulties of Individualism. 20 pp. Sidney Webb.

70. Report on Fabian Policy. 16 pp.  Bernard Shaw.

71. The (London) Tenant's Sanitary Catechism. 4 pp.  Miss Grove.

72. The Moral Aspects of Socialism. 24 pp. Sidney Ball.

73. The Case for State Pensions in Old Age. 16 pp.  George Turner.

74. The State and Its Functions in New Zealand. 16 pp. The Hon. W. P. Reeves.*

1897

75. Labour in the Longest Reign. 20 pp. Sidney Webb.

76. Houses for the People. 20 pp.  Arthur Hickmott.

77. The Municipalisation of Tramways. 16 pp. F.T.H. Henlé.

78. Socialism and the Teaching of Christ. 16 pp. Rev. John Clifford, D.D.

79. A Word of Remembrance and Caution to the Rich. 16 pp. John Woolman.*

80. Shop Life and its Reform. 16 pp.  William Johnson.

81. Municipal Water. 4 pp. C.M. Knowles.*

82. The Workmen's Compensation Act. 20 pp. C.R. Allen, junr.

83. State Arbitration and the Living Wage. 16 pp.  H.W. Macrosty.

84. The Economics of Direct Employment. 16 pp. Sidney Webb.

85. Liquor Licensing at Home and Abroad. 16 pp. Edw. R. Pease.

86. Municipal Drink Traffic. 20 pp.  Edw. R. Pease.

1899

87. A Welsh Translation of No. 78. 16 pp.

88. The Growth of Monopoly in English Industry. 16 pp. Henry W. Macrosty.

89. Old Age Pensions at Work. 4 pp.  Bullock.

90. The Municipalisation of the Milk Supply. 4 pp.  Dr. G.F. McCleary.

91. Municipal Pawnshops. 4 pp. Charles Charrington.

92. Municipal Slaughterhouses. 4 pp. George Standring.

1900

93. Women as Councillors. 4 pp.  Bernard Shaw.

94. Municipal Bakeries. 4 pp.  Dr. G.F. McCleary.

95. Municipal Hospitals. 4 pp.  Do.

96. Municipal Fire Insurance. 4 pp. (1901).  Mary Macpherson.

97. Municipal Steamboats. 4 pp. (1901).  Sidney Shallard.

98. State Railways for Ireland. 16 pp. Clement Edwards (M.P.).

99. Local Government in Ireland.  C.R. Allen, junr.

100. Metropolitan Borough Councils: Their Powers and Duties. 20 pp. Henry W. Macrosty.

101. The House Famine and How to Relieve it. 52 pp. Various.

102. Questions for Candidates: Metropolitan Borough Councils. 4 pp. H.W. Macrosty.

103. Overcrowding in London and its Remedy. 16 pp. W. C. Steadman, M.P.

104. How Trade Unions Benefit Workmen. 4 pp.  Edw. R. Pease.

1901

105. Five Years' Fruit of the Parish Councils Act. 24 pp  Sidney Webb.

106. The Education Muddle and the Way Out. 20 pp.  Sidney Webb.

107. Socialism for Millionaires. 16 pp. Bernard Shaw.

108. Twentieth Century Politics: A Policy of National Efficiency. 16 pp. Sidney Webb.

1902

109. Cottage Plans and Common Sense. 16 pp. Raymond Unwin.

110. Problems of Indian Poverty. 16 pp. S.S. Thorburn.*

111. Reform of Reformatories and Industrial Schools. 16 pp. H.T. Holmes.

112. Life in the Laundry. 16 pp. Dr. G.F. McCleary.

1903

113. Communism. 16 pp. William Morris.* Preface by Bernard Shaw.

114. The Education Act, 1902. How to make the best of it. 20 pp. Sidney Webb.

115. State Aid to Agriculture. 16 pp. T.S. Dymond.*

1904

116. Fabianism and the Fiscal Question: An Alternative Policy. 28 pp. Bernard Shaw.

117. The London Education Act, 1903: How to make the best of it. 20 pp. Sidney Webb.

118. The Secret of Rural Depopulation. 20 pp. Lieut.-Col. D.C. Pedder.*

1905

119. Public Control of Electric Power and Transit. 16 pp. S.G. Hobson.

120. After Bread, Education. 16 pp. Hubert Bland.

121. Public Service versus Private Expenditure. 12 pp. Sir Oliver Lodge.*

122. Municipal Milk and Public Health. 20 pp. F. Lawson Dodd.

123. The Revival of Agriculture: A National Policy for Great Britain. 24 pp. Henry W. Macrosty.

124. State Control of Trusts. 16 pp. Henry W. Macrosty.

125. Municipalisation by Provinces. 16 pp. William Stephen Sanders.

1906

126. The Abolition of Poor Law Guardians. 24 pp. Edw. R. Pease.

127. Socialism and Labour Policy. 16 pp.  Hubert Bland (Editor).

128. The Case for a Legal Minimum Wage. 20 pp.  W. Stephen Sanders.

129. More Books to Read. 20 pp.  Edw. R. Pease.

1907

130. Home Work and Sweating: The Causes and Remedies. 20 pp. B. L. Hutchins.

131. The Decline in the Birth-rate. 20 pp. Sidney Webb.

132. A Guide to Books for Socialists. 12 pp. "The Nursery."

133. Socialism and Christianity. 24 pp. Rev. Percy Dearmer, D.D.

134. Small Holdings, Allotments, and Common Pastures. 4 pp. Revised edition of No. 58.

135. Paupers and Old Age Pensions. 16 pp. Sidney Webb.

136. The Village and the Landlord. 12 pp. Edward Carpenter.

1908

137. Parish Councils and Village Life. 28pp. Revised version of No. 105.

138. Municipal Trading. 20 pp.  Aylmer Maude.

139. Socialism and the Churches. 16 pp. Rev. John Clifford, D.D.

140. Child Labour Under Capitalism. 20 pp. Mrs. Hylton Dale.

1909

141. (Welsh Translation of No. 139).

142. Rent and Value. 12 pp. Adapted by Mrs. Bernard Shaw from Fabian Essays, The Economic Basis.

143. Sosialaeth Yng Ngoleuni'R Beibl (Welsh). J.R. Jones.

144. Machinery: Its Masters and its Servants. 20 pp. Henry Herman Schloesser and Clement Game.

145. The Case for School Nurseries. 20 pp. Emily Townshend.

146. Socialism and Superior Brains. A Reply to Mr. Mallock. 24 pp. Bernard Shaw.

147. Capital and Compensation. 16 pp. Edward R. Pease.

148. What a Health Committee can do. 16 pp.  Miss B.L. Hutchins.

1910

149. The Endowment of Motherhood. 24 pp. Henry D. Harben.

150. State Purchase of Railways: A Practicable Scheme. 24 pp. Emil Davies.

151. The Point of Honour. A Correspondence on Aristocracy and Socialism. 16 pp. Mrs. Ruth Cavendish Bentinck.

1911

152. Our Taxes as they are and as they ought to be. 20 pp. Robert Jones.

153. The Twentieth Century Reform Bill. 20 pp. Henry H. Schloesser (Slesser).

154. The Case for School Clinics. 16 pp. L. Haden Guest.

155. The Case against the Referendum. 20 pp. Clifford D. Sharp.

156. What an Education Committee can do (Elementary Schools). 36 pp. The Education Group.

157. The Working Life of Women. 16 pp. Miss B.L. Hutchins.

158. The Case Against the Charity Organisation Society. 20 pp. Mrs. Townshend.

159. The Necessary Basis of Society. 12 pp. Sidney Webb.

160. A National Medical Service. 20 pp. F. Lawson Dodd.

1912

161. Afforestation and Unemployment. 16 pp. Arthur P. Grenfell.

162. Family Life on a Pound a Week. 24 pp. Mrs. Pember Reeves.

163. Women and Prisons. 28 pp. Helen Blagg and Charlotte Wilson.

164. Gold and State Banking. A Study in the Economics of Monopoly. 20 pp. Edward R. Pease.

165. Francis Place: The Tailor of Charing Cross. 28 pp. St. John G. Ervine.

166. Robert Owen: Social Reformer. 24 pp. Miss B.L. Hutchins.

167. William Morris and the Communist Ideal. 24 pp. Mrs. Townshend.

1913

168. John Stuart Mill. 24 pp. Julius West.

169. The Socialist Movement in Germany. 28 pp. W. Stephen Sanders.

170. Profit-Sharing and Co-partnership: A fraud and a failure? 16 pp. Edward R. Pease.

171. The Nationalisation of Mines and Minerals Bill. 16 pp. Henry H. Schloesser (Slesser).

172. What about the Rates, or Municipal Finance and Municipal Autonomy. 12 pp. Sidney Webb.

173. Public versus Private Electricity Supply. 20 pp. C. Ashmore Baker.*

1914

174. Charles Kingsley and Christian Socialism. 28 pp. Colwyn E. Vulliamy.

175. The Economic Foundations of the Women's Movement. 24 pp. M.A. (Mabel Atkinson).

176. War and the Workers. Handbook of some immediate measures to prevent Unemployment and relieve distress. 24 pp. Sidney Webb.

1915

177. Socialism and the Arts of Use. 16 pp. A. Clutton Brock.

178. The War; Women; and Unemployment. 28 pp. The Women's Group Executive.

See also
List of Fabian Tracts since 1916

References

External links
http://onlinebooks.library.upenn.edu/webbin/serial?id=fabiantrc
http://digital.library.lse.ac.uk/collections/fabiansociety/tracts

Tracts (1884-1915)
Lists of books by imprint or publisher
Books about politics of England
Lists of British books
United Kingdom politics-related lists